The European Coalition (KE) was a short-lived political alliance and electoral list in Poland. It was established in 2019 by a group of former prime ministers and former foreign ministers, including Jerzy Buzek, Ewa Kopacz, Grzegorz Schetyna and Radosław Sikorski. They declared the will to construct "one broad list in European Parliament election, the aim of which would be to restore Poland's strong position in the European Union". The Coalition is to be pro-European and centrist.

Parties included in the coalition are the Democratic Left Alliance (since 16 February), The Greens (since 17 February), Now! (since 18 February), Civic Platform (since 21 February), Modern, Democratic Party (since 22 February), Polish People's Party, Union of European Democrats (since 23 February), Social Democracy of Poland (since 2 March), Liberty and Equality (since 3 March), League of Polish Families (since 11 March) and Feminist Initiative (since 15 March).

The Coalition also gained the support from Barbara Nowacka and her movement, the Polish Initiative and civic organisation Committee for the Defence of Democracy.

The Coalition came in second place in the 2019 European Parliament election with 38.5% of the vote, returning 22 MEPs.

The disappointing results led the agrarian Polish People's Party (PSL) to opt out of the coalition and set up the Polish Coalition instead, which should not include leftist parties.

Signatories 
Prominent signatories of the European Coalition's foundation appeal include: 
 Marek Belka (SLD), former prime minister (2004–05), former president of the National Bank of Poland (2010–16)
 Jerzy Buzek (PO), former prime minister (1997–2001), former president of the European Parliament (2009–2012)
 Włodzimierz Cimoszewicz (SLD), former prime minister (1996–97), former minister of foreign affairs (2001–05)
 Ewa Kopacz (PO), former prime minister (2014–15), former marshal of the Sejm (2011–14)
 Kazimierz Marcinkiewicz (ex-PiS), former prime minister (2005–06)
 Leszek Miller (SLD), former prime minister (2001–04)
 Adam Daniel Rotfeld, former minister of foreign affairs (2005)
 Grzegorz Schetyna (PO), leader of PO (since 2016), former minister of foreign affairs (2014–15), former marshal of the Sejm (2010–11)
 Radosław Sikorski (PO), former minister of foreign affairs (2007–14), former marshal of the Sejm (2014–15)
 Hanna Suchocka (ex-UD/UW), former prime minister (1992–93)

Composition 
The main parties include the following:

Also affiliated to the coalition include the following:

Candidates 
The European Coalition lists in the 13 constituencies are headed by:
 District 1 (Pomeranian): Janusz Lewandowski (PO)
 District 2 (Kuyavian-Pomeranian): Radosław Sikorski (PO)
 District 3 (Podlaskie and Warmian-Masurian): Tomasz Frankowski (PO)
 District 4 (Warsaw): Włodzimierz Cimoszewicz (SLD)
 District 5 (Masovian, except Warsaw): Jarosław Kalinowski (PSL)
 District 6 (Łódź): Marek Belka (SLD)
 District 7 (Greater Poland): Ewa Kopacz (PO)
 District 8 (Lublin): Krzysztof Hetman (PSL)
 District 9 (Podkarpackie): Czesław Siekierski (PSL)
 District 10 (Lesser Poland and Świętokrzyskie): Róża Gräfin von Thun und Hohenstein (PO)
 District 11 (Silesian): Jerzy Buzek (PO)
 District 12 (Lower Silesian and Opole): Janina Ochojska (non-partisan, Polish Humanitarian Action)
 District 13 (Lubusz and West Pomeranian): Bogusław Liberadzki (SLD)

Results

European Parliament

See also 
 Confederation KORWiN Braun Liroy Nationalists
 United Right

Notes

References

2019 disestablishments in Poland
2019 establishments in Poland
Civic Coalition (Poland)
Defunct political party alliances in Poland
Liberal parties in Poland
Political parties disestablished in 2019
Political parties established in 2019
Pro-European political parties in Poland